Lorenzi ("Lorenzi - an Italian family name") is a bairro in the District of Sede in the municipality of Santa Maria, in the Brazilian state of Rio Grande do Sul. It is located in south Santa Maria.

Villages 
The bairro contains the following villages: Estância do Minuano, Lorenzi, Vila Bom Jesus, Vila Lorenzi, Vila Quitandinha, Vila Santa Rita de Cássia, Vila Santo Antônio, Vila Severo, Vila Tavares.

References 

Bairros of Santa Maria, Rio Grande do Sul